Tata Motors Cars is a division of the India-based automaker Tata Motors which produces cars under the brand name Tata Motors . It is currently the 2nd largest car manufacturer in India in terms of sales after Maruti Suzuki .

History

Tata Motors entered the passenger vehicle market in 1991 with the launch of the Tata Sierra, a multi utility vehicle. This was followed by the launch of the Tata Estate in 1992 (a stationwagon based on the existing TataMobile light commercial vehicle) and the Tata Sumo in 1994, India's first sports utility vehicle.

Tata launched the Indica in 1998, the first fully indigenous Indian passenger car. Although initially criticised by auto-analysts, its excellent fuel economy, powerful engine and an aggressive marketing strategy made it one of the best selling cars in the history of the Indian automobile industry. A newer version of the car, named Indica V2, was a major improvement over the previous version and quickly became a mass favourite. Tata Motors also successfully exported large quantities of the car to South Africa. The success of Indica played a key role in the growth of Tata Motors.

In January 2008, Tata Motors launched Tata Nano, the least expensive production car in the world at about 120,000 (3,000). The city car was unveiled during the Auto Expo 2008 exhibition in Pragati Maidan, New Delhi.

Tata has faced controversy over developing the Nano as some environmentalists like Anumita Roychoudhury, of the Centre for Science and Environment in Delhi, and Rajendra K. Pachauri, chairperson of the Intergovernmental Panel on Climate Change (IPCC), are concerned that the launch of such a low-priced car could lead to mass motorization in India with adverse effects on pollution and global warming. Tata had set up a factory in Sanand, Gujarat and the first Nanos were rolled out in summer of 2009.

Tata Nano Europa had been developed for sale in developed economies and it hit markets in 2010 while the normal Nano had hit markets in South Africa, Kenya and countries in Asia and Africa by late 2009.

Tata Motors Cars has launched further expansion into Southeast Asia by expanding into Vietnam and the Philippines.

At the 12th Auto Expo in February 2014, Tata Motors unveiled The Bolt, a hatchback and The Zest, a compact sedan. They are slated to launch in August 2014.

Tata Motors increased its capital expenditure by 30 per cent to Rs 32,000 in order accelerate its shift toward electric vehicles

In 2020, there were plans for Chinese auto maker Chery to buy a percentage of Tata Motors in order for Chery (who already make Jaguar Land Rover cars in a joint venture in China) to gain entry into the Indian market and in order for Tata Motors to get technology for cars such as the proposed Tata Blackbird. However, due to Covid-19 and the continuing political tensions over the Chinese/Indian border and other geopolitical reasons it is extremely unlikely that the company Chery will buy any part of Tata Motors.

It was announced on May 30, 2022, Tata Motors signed an MOU with the Gujarat Government to acquire Ford India’s Sanand manufacturing plant.

Products

Current Models

ICE Vehicles

Electric Vehicles

Former Models 
 Tata Telcoline (1988–2010)
 Tata Sierra (1991–2003)
 Tata Estate (1992–2000)
 Tata Sumo (1994–2019)
 Tata Indica (1998–2015)
 Tata Spacio (2000-2011)
 Tata Indigo (2002–2015)
 Tata Indigo Marina (2006–2009)
 Tata Xenon (2007–2018)
 Tata Sumo Grande (2008–2016)
 Tata Vista (2008–2015)
 Tata Nano (2008–2018)
 Tata Manza (2009–2016)
 Tata Venture (2010–2017)
 Tata Aria (2010–2017)
 Tata Zest (2014–2020)
 Tata Bolt (2014–2019)
 Tata Hexa (2017–2020)

Manufacturing Facilities
Pune (Maharashtra)
Sanand Plant (Gujarat)

Concept vehicles

 2000 Aria Roadster
 2001 Aria Coupe
 2002 Tata Indica
 2004 Tata Indigo Advent
 2005 Tata Xover
 2006 Tata Cliffrider
 2007 Tata Elegante
 2009 Tata Prima
 2011 Tata Pixel
 2012 Tata Megapixel
 2014 Tata Nexon
 2014 Tata Connectnext
 2017 Tata TaMo Racemo
 2018 Tata 45X Concept (Launched as Tata Altroz on 22 January 2020)
 2018 Tata H5X Concept (Launched as Tata Harrier on 23 January 2019)
 2019 Tata H7x (later known as Tata Gravitas and launched as Tata Safari on 15 Feb 2021)
 2020 tata HBX Concept (Launched as Tata Punch on 18 Oct 2021)
 2020 Tata Altroz EV (Expected Launch: 2022)
 2020 Tata Sierra EV concept (Expected Launch: 2023)
 Tata E-Vision Electric
 2022 Tata Curvv Electric
 2022 Tata Avinya Electric (Scheduled To Launch In 2025)
 2023 Tata Sierra.ev
 2023 Tata Harrier.ev

References

External links

 

Car manufacturers of India
Tata Motors
Companies with year of establishment missing